This is a list of official football games played by Iran national football team between 2000 and 2009.

2000
Friendly

Friendly

Friendly

Friendly

2000 AFC Asian Cup Qualifier

2000 AFC Asian Cup Qualifier

2000 AFC Asian Cup Qualifier

2000 AFC Asian Cup Qualifier

2000 AFC Asian Cup Qualifier

2000 AFC Asian Cup Qualifier

2000 WAFF West Asian Championship – Preliminary Round

2000 WAFF West Asian Championship – Preliminary Round

2000 WAFF West Asian Championship – Preliminary Round

2000 WAFF West Asian Championship – Semifinal

2000 WAFF West Asian Championship – Final

2000 LG Cup  – Semifinal

2000 LG Cup – 3rd Place Match

Friendly

Friendly

Friendly

2000 AFC Asian Cup – Preliminary Round

2000 AFC Asian Cup – Preliminary Round

2000 AFC Asian Cup – Preliminary Round

2000 AFC Asian Cup – Quarterfinal

2002 FIFA World Cup Qualifier – First Round

2002 FIFA World Cup Qualifier – First Round

2001
2001 Civilization Cup – 3rd Place Match

2001 LG Cup – Semifinal

2001 LG Cup – 3rd Place Match

Friendly

Friendly

2001 LG Cup – Semifinal

2001 LG Cup – Final

Friendly

2002 FIFA World Cup Qualifier – Second Round

2002 FIFA World Cup Qualifier – Second Round

2002 FIFA World Cup Qualifier – Second Round

2002 FIFA World Cup Qualifier – Second Round

2002 FIFA World Cup Qualifier – Second Round

2002 FIFA World Cup Qualifier – Second Round

2002 FIFA World Cup Qualifier – Second Round

2002 FIFA World Cup Qualifier – Second Round

2002 FIFA World Cup Qualifier – Third Round

2002 FIFA World Cup Qualifier – Third Round

2002 FIFA World Cup Qualifier – Play-off AFC/UEFA

2002 FIFA World Cup Qualifier – Play-off AFC/UEFA

2002
Friendly

2002 LG Cup – Semifinal

Friendly

Friendly

Friendly

2002 WAFF West Asian Championship – Preliminary Round

2002 WAFF West Asian Championship – Preliminary Round

2002 WAFF West Asian Championship – Semifinal

2002 WAFF West Asian Championship – 3rd Place Match

2002 LG Cup – Final

2003
2003 Lunar New Year Cup – Final

2003 LG Cup – Semifinal

Friendly

2004 AFC Asian Cup Qualifier – Final Round

2004 AFC Asian Cup Qualifier – Final Round

2004 AFC–OFC Challenge Cup

2004 AFC Asian Cup Qualifier – Final Round

2004 AFC Asian Cup Qualifier – Final Round

* The match was abandoned after 61 minutes with Iran leading 1–0 after North Korea walked off the pitch due to firecrackers thrown from the crowd; despite the instructions of the referee, North Korea refused to return to the pitch. The match was awarded 3–0 to Iran.

2004 AFC Asian Cup Qualifier – Final Round

2004 AFC Asian Cup Qualifier – Final Round

Friendly

2004
2006 FIFA World Cup Qualifier – Second Round

2006 FIFA World Cup Qualifier – Second Round

2006 FIFA World Cup Qualifier – Second Round

2004 WAFF West Asian Championship – Preliminary Round

2004 WAFF West Asian Championship – Preliminary Round

2004 WAFF West Asian Championship – Semifinal

2004 WAFF West Asian Championship – Final

2004 AFC Asian Cup – Preliminary Round

2004 AFC Asian Cup – Preliminary Round

2004 AFC Asian Cup – Preliminary Round

2004 AFC Asian Cup – Quarterfinal

2004 AFC Asian Cup – Semifinal

2004 AFC Asian Cup – 3rd Place Match

2006 FIFA World Cup Qualifier – Second Round

Friendly

2006 FIFA World Cup Qualifier – Second Round

2006 FIFA World Cup Qualifier – Second Round

Friendly

2005
Friendly

2006 FIFA World Cup Qualifier – Third Round

2006 FIFA World Cup Qualifier – Third Round

2006 FIFA World Cup Qualifier – Third Round

Friendly

2006 FIFA World Cup Qualifier – Third Round

2006 FIFA World Cup Qualifier – Third Round

2006 FIFA World Cup Qualifier – Third Round

Friendly

Friendly

2005 Tehran Cup – 3rd Place Match

2006
2007 AFC Asian Cup Qualifier

Friendly

Friendly

Friendly

2006 FIFA World Cup – Preliminary Round

2006 FIFA World Cup – Preliminary Round

2006 FIFA World Cup – Preliminary Round

Friendly

2007 AFC Asian Cup Qualifier

2007 AFC Asian Cup Qualifier

2007 AFC Asian Cup Qualifier

2006 LG Cup

2006 LG Cup

2007 AFC Asian Cup Qualifier

2007 AFC Asian Cup Qualifier

2007
Friendly

Friendly

Friendly

Friendly

2007 WAFF West Asian Championship – Preliminary Round

* FIFA recognized this match as a full international despite the Iranian side being Iran B.

2007 WAFF West Asian Championship – Preliminary Round

* FIFA recognized this match as a full international despite the Iranian side being Iran B.

2007 WAFF West Asian Championship – Semifinal

* FIFA recognized this match as a full international despite the Iranian side being Iran B.

2007 WAFF West Asian Championship – Final

* FIFA recognized this match as a full international despite the Iranian side being Iran B.

Friendly

2007 AFC Asian Cup – Preliminary Round

2007 AFC Asian Cup – Preliminary Round

2007 AFC Asian Cup – Preliminary Round

2007 AFC Asian Cup – Quarterfinal

2008
Friendly

Friendly

2010 FIFA World Cup Qualifier – Third Round

Friendly

2010 FIFA World Cup Qualifier – Third Round

Friendly

2010 FIFA World Cup Qualifier – Third Round

2010 FIFA World Cup Qualifier – Third Round

2010 FIFA World Cup Qualifier – Third Round

2010 FIFA World Cup Qualifier – Third Round

2008 WAFF West Asian Championship – Preliminary Round

2008 WAFF West Asian Championship – Preliminary Round

2008 WAFF West Asian Championship – Semifinal

2008 WAFF West Asian Championship – Final

Friendly

2010 FIFA World Cup Qualifier – Fourth Round

2010 FIFA World Cup Qualifier – Fourth Round

Friendly

2010 FIFA World Cup Qualifier – Fourth Round

2008 Oman International Cup – Semifinal

2008 Oman International Cup – 3rd Place Match

2009
Friendly

2011 AFC Asian Cup Qualifier

2011 AFC Asian Cup Qualifier

2010 FIFA World Cup Qualifier – Fourth Round

Friendly

2010 FIFA World Cup Qualifier – Fourth Round

Friendly

Friendly

2010 FIFA World Cup Qualifier – Fourth Round

2010 FIFA World Cup Qualifier – Fourth Round

2010 FIFA World Cup Qualifier – Fourth Round

Friendly

* FIFA recognized this match as a full international despite the Iranian side being Iran U-23.

Friendly

Friendly

Friendly

Friendly

2011 AFC Asian Cup Qualifier

Friendly

2011 AFC Asian Cup Qualifier

2010 Qatar Friendship Cup

2010 Qatar Friendship Cup

Statistics

Results by year

Managers

* Coached Iran B team in 2007 WAFF Championship.** Coached Iran U-23 team in Botswana friendly match.

Opponents

External links
 www.teammelli.com
 www.fifa.com

2000s in Iranian sport
2000
1999–2000 in Iranian football
2000–01 in Iranian football
2001–02 in Iranian football
2002–03 in Iranian football
2003–04 in Iranian football
2004–05 in Iranian football
2005–06 in Iranian football
2006–07 in Iranian football
2007–08 in Iranian football
2008–09 in Iranian football
2009–10 in Iranian football